Thorium resources are a potential source for low-carbon energy. Thorium has been demonstrated to perform as a nuclear fuel in several reactor designs. It is present with a higher abundance than uranium in the crust of the earth. Thorium resources have not been estimated and assessed with a higher level of confidence, as in the case of uranium. Approximately 6 million tonnes of thorium have been estimated globally based on currently limited exploration and mainly on historical data.

Thorium resources are found widely in over 35 countries all over the world. As there is currently negligible commercial use of thorium, the resources should be considered potentially viable according to the United Nations Framework Classification for Resources. Figures are given in metric tonnes of thorium metal.

See also
Thorium
Occurrence of thorium
List of countries by uranium reserves
Thorium fuel cycle
Thorium-based nuclear power
Thorium Energy Alliance

References

Sources

Nuclear fuels
Nuclear technology
Thorium